Abdul Razak Abdul Kadir was formerly the Deputy Minister of Defence and the 12th Commander of the Royal Brunei Land Forces (RBLF) in 2022.

Biography

Early life and education 
On 21 March 1972, Abdul Razak was born. He started his career on 21 September 1989, when he joined the Royal Brunei Armed Forces and was designated as an Officer Cadet in 1994. In 1994 and 1995, he participated in Officer Cadet Training at the Royal Military College in Sungai Besi, Kuala Lumpur, Malaysia. Shortly after, he was appointed a Second Lieutenant. He graduated with a master's degree from the University of Balochistan in Pakistan in 2010 after completing his command and staff course at the Command and Staff College Quetta. He attended the Philippine National Defence College and received a master's degree in national security administration in September 2016.

Military career 
During Abdul Razak's time in the RBAF, he held a variety of positions, including those of platoon commander, armored reconnaissance troop leader, adjutant, squadron second-in-command, company commander, armored reconnaissance squadron commander, battalion second-in-command, and staff officer grade one at the Ministry of Defence. In addition, from 2005 to 2006, he performed a tour of duty as a member of the RBAF International Monitoring Team (IMT) in Cotabato City, Mindanao, Philippines. He received a promotion to Lieutenant Colonel in 2012, and from 2013 to 2016 he served as Sultan Hassanal Bolkiah's aide-de-camp. On 1 January 2018, he assumed leadership of the Directorship at the Defense Minister's Office and Directorate of Strategic Planning. Later that year on 13 July, he was elevated to the rank of Colonel. On 24 July 2020, Abdul Razak was promoted to Brigadier General with the approval of the Sultan of Brunei. On 28 August 2020, he assumed command as Joint Force Commander of the RBAF. On 1 March 2022, he was then named Commander of the RBLF, therefore replacing Haszaimi Bol Hassan and becoming the 12th commander of the branch.

Political career 
Dato Razak was appointed as the Deputy Minister of Defense on 7 June 2022. On 5 July of that same year, Chinese Ambassador Yu Hong met with him, and was congratulated by Ambassador Yu on his new position. She would then go on to praise the successes of the two countries' relations. On 3 February 2023, State Defense Minister Toshiro Ino met with him, and witnessed the signing of a Memorandum of Cooperation between the Ministry of Defense of Japan and the Ministry of Defence of Brunei Darussalam on Defense Cooperation and Exchanges. His time as deputy minister was short lived as his appointment was terminated alongside his position being abolished by the command of Sultan Hassanal Bolkiah on 27 February 2023.

Personal life 
Abdul Razak has a son and two children from his marriage to Datin Hajah Maimunah binti Haji Bakar. He likes to travel and play golf.

Honours 
The PJG was given to Dato Razak in appreciation of his unwavering dedication and exceptional efforts to boost the defense relations and professional cooperation between the RBLF and the Singapore Army. Abdul Razak also given the following honours;

National 

  Order of Pahlawan Negara Brunei First Class (PSPNB) – Dato Seri Pahlawan (15 July 2022)
  Order of Setia Negara Brunei Fourth Class (PSB) – (2002)
  Meritorious Service Medal (PJK) – (2008)
  Silver Jubilee Medal – (5 October 1992)
  Golden Jubilee Medal – (5 October 2017)
  General Service Medal (Armed Forces)
  Long Service Medal (Armed Forces)
  Royal Brunei Armed Forces Golden Jubilee Medal – (31 May 2011)

Foreign 

 :
  Pingat Jasa Gemilang (PJG) – (1 September 2022)

References 

Living people
1972 births
Bruneian military leaders